Unione Calcio Sampdoria had a decent season, in which it troubled the top three in the Serie A, and at half season even threatening to overhaul Juventus's league title, before losing its form during the spring. Vincenzo Montella, brought in from rivals Genoa to replace the departed Enrico Chiesa, sensationally equalled Chiesa's tally of 22 goals. Following the end of the season, coach Sven-Göran Eriksson moved to Lazio, and brought both Roberto Mancini and Siniša Mihajlović with him. With playmaker Clarence Seedorf departing for Real Madrid, Sampdoria was once again in a predicament. It still possessed Juan Sebastián Verón's unique qualities, however. The Argentinian was a genuine sensation in his first European season, and stayed on for another year.

Players

Transfers

Winter

Competitions

Serie A

League table

Results by round

Matches

Coppa Italia

Second round

Replay

Statistics

Players statistics

Goalscorers
  Vincenzo Montella 22
  Roberto Mancini 15
  Marco Carparelli 6
  Juan Sebastián Verón 5
  Siniša Mihajlović 3

References

U.C. Sampdoria seasons
Sampdoria